Roland Surrugue (6 August 1938 – 28 June 1997) was a French cyclist. He competed in the tandem event at the 1960 Summer Olympics.

References

External links
 

1938 births
1997 deaths
French male cyclists
Olympic cyclists of France
Cyclists at the 1960 Summer Olympics
Sportspeople from Saint-Germain-en-Laye
Cyclists from Île-de-France